Dichostates lignarius is a species of beetle in the family Cerambycidae. It was described by Félix Édouard Guérin-Méneville in 1850. It is known from Botswana, Namibia, Ethiopia, Mozambique, Somalia, Kenya, Zimbabwe, and South Africa.

Subspecies
 Dichostates lignarius lacunosus Fahraeus, 1872
 Dichostates lignarius lignarius (Guérin-Méneville, 1850)

References

Crossotini
Beetles described in 1850